Ward Brackett (April 2, 1914 – December 14, 2006) was an American artist who created for paperback books and magazines, including the Reader's Digest and Cosmopolitan. He lived in Westport, Connecticut, for 59 years and was a member of the Society of Illustrators, the Silvermine Arts Guild and the Westport Arts Center.

References
Ward G. Brackett, 92 — WestportNow.com — Westport, Connecticut Westportnow Media, LLC. (Retrieved 2 March 2011.)
Today's Inspiration: A Textbook Example: Ward Brackett Leif Peng, January 29, 2008. (Retrieved 2 March 2011.)
Today's Inspiration: Ward Brackett: into the 1960s Leif Peng, February 3, 2011. (Retrieved 2 March 2011.)
Today's Inspiration: Ward Brackett: around 1950

See also
Ward Brackett collection on Flickr

1914 births
2006 deaths
20th-century American painters
American male painters
American magazine illustrators
Artists from Connecticut
People from Westport, Connecticut
20th-century American male artists